Ariyavangsagatayana or Ariyavongsagatanana may refer to:
 Ariyavangsagatayana (Ou) (Ariyavangsagatayana I), 1st Thai monks who hold the title of Somdet Phra Ariyavangsagatayana and 1st abbot of Wat Suthat, not hold the position of Supreme Patriarch of Thailand
 Ariyavangsagatayana (Sa Pussadeva) (Ariyavangsagatayana II), 9th Supreme Patriarch of Thailand (r. 1893–1899)
 Ariyavangsagatayana (Phae Tissadevo) (Ariyavangsagatayana III), 12th Supreme Patriarch of Thailand (r. 1938–1944)
 Ariyavangsagatayana (Plod Kittisobhaṇo) (Ariyavangsagatayana IV), 14th Supreme Patriarch of Thailand (r. 1960–1962)
 Ariyavangsagatayana (Yoo Ñāṇodayo) (Ariyavangsagatayana V), 15th Supreme Patriarch of Thailand (r. 1963–1965)
 Ariyavangsagatayana (Chuan Utthayi) (Ariyavangsagatayana VI), 16th Supreme Patriarch of Thailand (r. 1965–1971)
 Ariyavangsagatayana (Pun Puṇṇasiri) (Ariyavangsagatayana VII) 17th Supreme Patriarch of Thailand (r. 1972–1973)
 Ariyavangsagatayana (Vasana Vāsano) (Ariyavangsagatayana VIII) 18th Supreme Patriarch of Thailand (r. 1973–1988), posthumously elevated to the title "Somdet Phra Sangharaj Chao Krommaluang Jinavaralongkorn" in 2019.
 Ariyavangsagatayana (Amborn Ambaro) (Ariyavangsagatayana IX) 20th and current Supreme Patriarch of Thailand since 2017.